, also written as (145452) 2005 RN43, is a classical Kuiper belt object. It was discovered by Andrew Becker, Andrew Puckett and Jeremy Kubica on 10 September 2005 at Apache Point Observatory in Sunspot, New Mexico. Brown estimates that it is possibly a dwarf planet.

Classification 

The Minor Planet Center (MPC) classifies it as a cubewano. But since this object has an inclination of 19.3°, the Deep Ecliptic Survey (DES) classifies it as scattered-extended.

It has been observed 119 times over thirteen oppositions, with precovery images back to 1954.

See also

References

External links 
 

Classical Kuiper belt objects
2005 RN43
2005 RN43
2005 RN43
Possible dwarf planets
20050910